Barbara Cameron may refer to:

Entertainment industry personalities
Barbara Cameron (1926–2013), American singer-songwriter, of The Road Runner Show theme songs etc.
Barbara Cameron, American model, see List of Playboy Playmates of 1955#November
Barbara Cameron (born 1950), American actress, mother of actors Kirk Cameron and Candace Cameron Bure, see List of TV Guide covers (1990s)

Writers
Barbara Anne Cameron (born 1938), Canadian novelist, poet, screenwriter and short story writer 
Barbara Cameron (born 1956), American author and restaurateur, see American Literary Review#Prize winners

Others
Barbara Cameron, Canadian politician, Communist Party candidate for St. Paul's (electoral district)#Election results in 1974
Barbara May Cameron (1954–2002), American lesbian and Native Indian human rights activist
Barbara Cameron (bowls) (born 1962), Northern Irish lawn bowler

See also
Cameron (surname)